Bass Lake is a lake in the U.S. state of Washington.

Bass Lake was named for its stock of bass fish.

References

Lakes of Thurston County, Washington